Empersdorf is a municipality in the district of Leibnitz in the Austrian state of Styria.

Geography
Empersdorf is the northernmost municipality in the district of Leibnitz.

References

Cities and towns in Leibnitz District